Syncomistes is a genus of Australian freshwater ray-finned fish in the family Terapontidae, the grunters.

Species
Species include:

 Syncomistes bonapartensis Shelley, Delaval & Le Feuvre, 2017
 Syncomistes butleri Vari 1978 (Sharpnose grunter)
 Syncomistes carcharus Shelley, Delaval & Le Feuvre, 2017 (Sharp-toothed grunter)
 Syncomistes dilliensis Shelley, Delaval & Le Feuvre, 2017 (Dillie grunter)
 Syncomistes holsworthi Shelley, Delaval & Le Feuvre, 2017
 Syncomistes kimberleyensis Vari 1978 (Kimberley grunter)
 Syncomistes moranensis Shelley, Delaval & Le Feuvre, 2017
 Syncomistes rastellus Vari & Hutchins, 1978 (Drysdale grunter)
 Syncomistes trigonicus Vari, 1978 (Longnose grunter)
 Syncomistes versicolor Shelley, Delaval & Le Feuvre, 2017
 Syncomistes wunambal Shelley, Delaval & Le Feuvre, 2017

References

 
Terapontidae
Taxonomy articles created by Polbot